Théâtre du Nouvel-Ontario (Theatre of New-Ontario) is a Canadian professional theatre company. Located in Sudbury, Ontario, the company produces French language stage productions.

The company was founded in 1971 by the Coopérative des artistes du Nouvel-Ontario, a group of artists that included André Paiement, Marcel Aymar and Robert Paquette. It evolved out of an informal association of students at Laurentian University who united to write and perform a Franco-Ontarian musical theatre show, Moé, j'viens du nord, 'stie!, in 1970.

Other artists later to be associated with the company included Jean-Marc Dalpé and Brigitte Haentjens.

The company originally staged theatre productions at Laurentian's Fraser Auditorium. It subsequently acquired a former bakery on King Street in the city's Flour Mill neighbourhood, and remained there until building a new theatre on the grounds of Collège Boréal in the late 1990s. It is slated to move in 2022 to the new Place des Arts facility in downtown Sudbury.

References

External links
 Théâtre du Nouvel-Ontario

Theatre companies in Ontario
Culture of Greater Sudbury
Franco-Ontarian organizations